Theobald Ziegler (9 February 1846 – 1 September 1918) was a German philosopher and educator born in Göppingen, Württemberg.

Career
Ziegler studied theology and philosophy at the University of Tübingen, and later was a secondary school teacher in Heilbronn, Winterthur and Baden-Baden. During this time period he also taught classes at Tübinger Stift. In 1882 he became konrektor of a Protestant secondary school in Strasbourg, followed by an appointment as professor of philosophy at the University of Strasbourg (1886).

Published works
Among his literary efforts was a biography of David Friedrich Strauss, and a 1900 publication on Friedrich Nietzsche that was based on lectures Ziegler gave in 1897–98. Other significant writings by Ziegler include:
 Geschichte der christlichen Ethik, 1896 - History of Christian ethics.
 Sittliches Sein und sittliches Werden: Grundlinien eines Systems der Ethik, 1890 - Moral and ethical will; baseline of a system of ethics. 
 Religion und Religionen, 1893 - Religion and religions.
 Geschichte der Pädagogik, 1895 - History of education.
 Die geistigen und socialen strömungen des neunzehnten jahrhunderts, 1899 - The intellectual and social currents of the 19th century.

Today, in Frankfurt am Main, the "Theobald-Ziegler-Schule" (primary school) is named in his honor.

References 
 Theobald Ziegler translated biography @ Meyers Konversations-Lexikon

German philosophers
1846 births
1918 deaths
Academic staff of the University of Strasbourg
People from Göppingen
German male writers